Grant Samuel McCann (born 14 April 1980) is a Northern Irish professional football manager and former player who played as a midfielder in the Football League. He was most recently the manager of EFL League One club Peterborough United.

Born in Belfast, McCann played in the Distillery youth system from 1995 until signing for the West Ham United Academy of Football in 1996, where he started his professional career. He made his debut on 19 May 2001 in a 2–1 away defeat to Middlesbrough. McCann also won 39 caps for Northern Ireland after making his senior debut against Malta in 2001, with the last of his 39 caps won in a 6–0 friendly defeat against the Netherlands in June 2012.

Club career

West Ham and loans
Finding it hard to break into the West Ham first team McCann had loan spells at Livingston and Notts County before moving to Cheltenham Town, in another loan deal, in 2000. Despite only making a handful of substitute appearances for West Ham and never starting a game, he is remembered for scoring an unfortunate and bizarre own-goal during an infamous 1–7 away defeat to Blackburn Rovers on 14 October 2001. After coming off the bench, McCann attempted a clearance from inside his own penalty area but the ball somehow spun backwards behind him and past Shaka Hislop in the West Ham goal. This turned out to be McCann's final appearance for West Ham.

Cheltenham Town
After another loan deal took him back to Cheltenham in 2002, the move was made permanent during the January 2003 transfer window when he moved from West Ham for £50,000, a record transfer fee for Cheltenham Town. McCann went on to make 155 league appearances for the Gloucestershire club. He had made only four substitute appearances for The Hammers.

Barnsley
He joined Barnsley on loan deadline day, 23 November 2006, in a contract that expired on 1 January 2007. On his debut against Ipswich Town he scored a 92nd-minute winner in Simon Davey's first game as caretaker boss. The two clubs agreed a fee of £100,000 and McCann moved to Barnsley permanently on 2 January 2007. At the time this was a record fee for an outbound player from Cheltenham.

Scunthorpe
In January 2008, McCann left Barnsley to sign for Championship rivals Scunthorpe United for an undisclosed fee.

Peterborough United
On 24 May 2010, Peterborough United announced that they had beaten off competition from a host of Championship clubs to secure the services of McCann on a three-year contract. On 1 August, McCann was named the captain for the 2010–11 League One season, taking the role from George Boyd. He continued to hold this position for the 2011–12 season.

McCann has the rare achievement of being promoted via a play-off three times – once each with three clubs at three Stadiums – with Cheltenham Town at the Millennium Stadium, Cardiff, with Scunthorpe United at Wembley Stadium, London and with Peterborough United at Old Trafford, Manchester.

On 30 April 2012, McCann with seven other Peterborough players were placed on the transfer list by manager Darren Ferguson.

Linfield
On 14 January 2015, McCann returned to his native country to join NIFL Premiership side Linfield on a free transfer after his contract at Peterborough was terminated by mutual consent. He signed an initial six-month contract to last until the end of the 2014–15 season. McCann, who made close to 200 appearances in all competitions for Posh, had been assisting with the coaching of Peterborough's youth side in the weeks prior to his departure, but was keen to continue playing regularly. His brother, Ryan McCann, had previously played for Linfield between 2002 and 2005, winning several trophies with the Blues including the league title in 2004 and the Setanta Cup in 2005.

On 23 February 2015, McCann was linked to a coaching role at his former club Peterborough United, following the sacking of Darren Ferguson two days earlier. It was assumed that McCann would balance his role at Peterborough with his playing time at Linfield. However, it was later confirmed that McCann would be ending his stay at Linfield after just six weeks. During his short spell at the club, he made six appearances in all competitions, scoring once against Ballymena United in a league game.

Return to Peterborough United
On 26 February 2015, Linfield confirmed that McCann's contract had been terminated with immediate effect, facilitating his return to Peterborough in a coaching capacity until at least the end of the 2014–15 season.

Managerial career

Peterborough United
On 16 May 2016, McCann was appointed Peterborough United manager on a four-year contract. He was named League One Manager of the Month for August 2017, after his team got off to a flying start at the beginning of the season. On 25 February 2018, he was sacked after no wins in seven matches.

Doncaster Rovers
On 27 June 2018, McCann was announced as the new Doncaster Rovers manager. He led them to the play-offs on the final day of the season, 4 May 2019, with a 2–0 win over Coventry City. They finished in sixth place in the League One table. They lost to Charlton Athletic in the play-off semi-final stages. After two legs the aggregate score was 4–4 with Charlton winning 4–3 on penalties.

Hull City
McCann was appointed as head coach of Championship club Hull City on 21 June 2019 on a one-year rolling contract. City vice-chairman and son of owner Assem Allam, Ehab Allam said of McCann's appointment, "Grant has been a standout candidate with a playing style and philosophy aligned to that of the Club. With a great team of existing staff in their support and of the squad too, I hope for an exciting season ahead." On 14 July 2020, Hull lost 8–0 at Wigan Athletic, equalling their record loss to Wolverhampton Wanderers in November 1911. The result put Hull in the bottom three by one point having won once in their past 18 games with 14 defeats. Hull were relegated to League One in 24th and bottom place following a 3–0 defeat by Cardiff City on 22 July. Despite the relegation, McCann said he hoped to manage the team in the upcoming season.

McCann immediately led the team back to the Championship as League One Champions, winning promotion with two matches left to play after a 2–1 victory at Lincoln City. The title was secured the following match with a 3–1 victory over Wigan Athletic, as second placed Peterborough United were held to a 3–3 draw, a result that still saw them promoted. McCann was awarded a number of individual awards over the season, winning the League One Manager of the Month for both January 2021 and April 2021, culminating in him being named 2020–21 EFL League One Manager of the Season at the league's annual awards ceremony.

On 25 January 2022, McCann was sacked by the club following a takeover by a Turkish consortium. At the time the club were sitting in 19th position, ten points clear of the relegation zone.

Return to Peterborough United
On 24 February 2022, McCann returned to Peterborough United for a third spell, his second as manager. He was unable to save his side from relegation and they were immediately relegated back to League One on 23 April following a 1–0 home defeat to Nottingham Forest.

On 4 January 2023, McCann was sacked with the club sitting in eight position in League One, five points off the play-offs.

International career
He made his debut for the Northern Ireland national team on 6 October 2001 in a 1–0 away win against Malta.
He opened his goalscoring account for Northern Ireland by scoring the last goal, a header, in the 4–1 away win against Liechtenstein on 24 March 2007. The last of his 39 caps were won in a 6–0 friendly defeat against the Netherlands in June 2012.

International goals
Scores and results list Northern Ireland's goal tally first.

Career statistics

Playing statistics

Managerial statistics

Honours

As a player
Scunthorpe United
Football League One play-offs promotion: 2008–09

Peterborough United
Football League One play-offs promotion: 2010–11
Football League Trophy: 2013–14

As a manager
Hull City
League One: 2020–21

Individual
League One Manager of the Month: August 2017, September 2018, January 2021, April 2021
League One Manager of the Season: 2020–21

References

External links
Northern Ireland stats at Irish FA

1980 births
Living people
Association footballers from Belfast
Association footballers from Northern Ireland
Northern Ireland under-21 international footballers
Northern Ireland B international footballers
Northern Ireland international footballers
Association football midfielders
Lisburn Distillery F.C. players
West Ham United F.C. players
Livingston F.C. players
Notts County F.C. players
Cheltenham Town F.C. players
Barnsley F.C. players
Scunthorpe United F.C. players
Peterborough United F.C. players
Linfield F.C. players
Premier League players
English Football League players
NIFL Premiership players
Football managers from Northern Ireland
Peterborough United F.C. managers
Doncaster Rovers F.C. managers
Hull City A.F.C. managers
English Football League managers
Peterborough United F.C. non-playing staff